A Plate of Sardines is a Syrian documentary film by the director Omar Amiralay.

References

1997 films
1990s Arabic-language films
Syrian documentary films
Films directed by Omar Amiralay
1990s short documentary films
1997 short films
1997 documentary films
Documentary films about the Arab–Israeli conflict